Sohla El-Waylly (née Muzib) is an American chef, restaurateur, and YouTube personality. She was an assistant food editor at Bon Appétit, where she appeared in videos produced for the magazine's YouTube channel, and also produced videos with Andrew Rea on the Babish Culinary Universe YouTube channel. She currently hosts a food column and video series on other platforms.

Early life and education
Sohla Muzib was raised in Los Angeles in a Bengali-American family, who owned a Baskin-Robbins store. She continued in the restaurant industry by working for Outback Steakhouse.

She went to University of California, Irvine, where she studied economics and worked at a Cheesecake Factory on the side.

Beginning in 2008, El-Waylly attended The Culinary Institute of America (CIA).  She says that while at CIA, she was sexually harassed by a dean, and when she spoke up a female dean told her, "That's what happens in the real world. You better get used to it."

Career
After graduating, El-Waylly worked at restaurants in New York City such as Atera, which has two Michelin stars, and Del Posto, owned by Joe Bastianich.

In March 2016, El-Waylly and her husband opened a diner called Hail Mary in Brooklyn, which attracted favorable reviews. However, an early review from Scott Lynch for Quick Bites also stated, "I worry about Hail Mary because it's an ambitious, almost special-occasion restaurant wrapped inside a burger-and-shake joint." The restaurant closed after 11 months, which El-Waylly attributed in part to opening Hail Mary without other investors, and in part to the expectations of white customers. In a 2017 interview with GQ, El-Waylly explained that she perceived customers as often entering Hail Mary expecting "foreign or exotic ingredients" because of the owners' cultural backgrounds; she stated "There would have been more leeway allowed in the food shrouded by illusion of 'authenticity'...There are white chefs that can pull from different cultures without explanation, but us making white food always needs a thesis behind it." El-Waylly worked at Serious Eats as a culinary editor through most of 2018 and joined Bon Appétit magazine in August 2019. At Bon Appétit, she worked as an assistant food editor and appeared regularly on the magazine's popular YouTube channel.

In June 2020, a photo of Bon Appétit editor-in-chief Adam Rapoport in brownface resurfaced online and sparked widespread criticism. During an emergency company-wide Zoom meeting, El-Waylly called for Rapoport to step down. She then publicly accused the magazine of discriminating towards employees of color, claiming they were subject to lesser pay than their non-minority counterparts. Rapoport resigned the same day. In August 2020, El-Waylly announced on her Instagram that she would no longer appear in videos on the magazine's YouTube channel due to continued lack of progress by Condé Nast Entertainment in resolving the issues that had arisen, though she would continue to contribute recipes and articles to the magazine and website. Soon after, she announced she had completely severed ties with Bon Appétit.

On September 23, 2020, a new series titled Stump Sohla was announced, which would be hosted on Andrew Rea's Babish Culinary Universe YouTube channel. The show premiered the next day. El-Waylly said she decided to work with Rea because she would have more creative control and direct cut of the video revenue.  "I just really don't want to be a prop," she said in an interview with New York magazine. Rea and El-Waylly ended their collaboration in early 2021. El-Waylly also began a weekly column with Food52 called "Off-Script with Sohla" and is writing a cookbook.

El-Waylly hosts a web series for the American TV network History titled Ancient Recipes with Sohla. She also hosts a show for the New York Times Cooking YouTube channel titled Mystery Menu. She is also a judge on the HBO Max culinary reality competition The Big Brunch, along with Dan Levy and Will Guidara.

Personal life
El-Waylly lives in New York City with her husband, fellow chef Hisham "Ham" El-Waylly. They met while they were both attending the Culinary Institute of America.

References

External links 
 Profile as a contributor to Serious Eats

Living people
American YouTubers
American women chefs
American people of Bengali descent
Bon Appétit people
Chefs from California
Culinary Institute of America alumni
Food and cooking YouTubers
Year of birth missing (living people)
21st-century American women